The Chicago Enforcers were an American football team of the XFL based at Soldier Field in Chicago, Illinois. The XFL was begun by Vince McMahon of the WWE and by NBC, a major television network in the United States. NBC dropped XFL broadcasts after the first season in 2001 due to dismal ratings, and the league was dissolved shortly thereafter.

The team name references mob enforcers, alluding to Chicago's history of mafia influence. The team's fight song would later become the entrance music for professional wrestler Brock Lesnar who had signed a contract with the WWE but was yet to debut.

The "Chicago Enforcers" name is used by the Chicago Police Department for their works team in the National Public Safety Football League.

2001 season

Originally, rumors swirled that former Chicago Bears defensive coordinator and Philadelphia Eagles head coach Buddy Ryan would be hired as the team's coach. Ultimately, Hall of Fame linebacker Dick Butkus was hired for the position. However, just before the season started, he resigned to take a position in the XFL office.  He was replaced by Ron Meyer, a former NFL head coach from the 1980s who had not coached professional football since 1994 with the Las Vegas Posse.

Among their players was former NFL running back LeShon Johnson, who had played for the Green Bay Packers, Arizona Cardinals and the New York Giants. He was starting tailback for the Cardinals for most of 1996. He led the Enforcers with 6 rushing touchdowns, which was second in the league. They also had former NFL running back John Avery who played for the Miami Dolphins.  Their wide receiver/kick returner Roell Preston (who previously played for the Atlanta Falcons, Green Bay Packers, Miami Dolphins, San Francisco 49ers, and Tennessee Titans) held the distinction of being the only former Pro Bowler (1998 as a Packer) to play in the XFL.  The team's starting right guard, Bennie Anderson, went on to be a starter for the Baltimore Ravens and Buffalo Bills, and last played professional football in 2006 for the Miami Dolphins.

The Enforcers got off to a slow start, losing their first four games with Tim Lester; at the time, Lester was working as a math teacher and assistant football coach at Wheaton Warrenville South High School in the suburbs of Chicago and played for the Enforcers effectively as a semi-professional player. In week 5, the team replaced Lester with the former Notre Dame Quatrerback Kevin McDougal, cut Lester, and brought in Craig Whelihan (an established NFL backup who had been third string on the Memphis Maniax at the time) to serve as McDougal's backup. The team went 5-1 in the rest of the season (winning their last four in a row), coming from behind to make the XFL playoffs at 2nd place in the Eastern Division. In addition to their potent rushing attack led by league leading running back John Avery, they were also known for their hard hitting defense. They lost to eventual XFL champion Los Angeles Xtreme in the crossover semifinals.

The Enforcers were part of the Eastern Division with the Orlando Rage, New York/New Jersey Hitmen and the Birmingham Thunderbolts. Their radio flagship station was WMVP, ESPN Radio 1000.

Poor attendance and the pending renovation of Soldier Field would have meant that, even if the league had continued, the Enforcers would have not; the league was exploring relocating the team to Milwaukee at the time of the league's closure.

Season-by-season

|-
|2001 || 5 || 5 || 0 || 2nd Eastern || Lost Semifinals (Los Angeles)
|-
!Totals || 5 || 6 || 0
|colspan="2"| (including playoffs)

Schedule

Regular season

Post-season

Standings

Roster

Team leaders
Rushing yards: 800 John Avery (league leader)
Receiving yards: 546 Aaron Bailey
Passing yards: 1168 Kevin McDougal
Passing touchdowns:  5 Kevin McDougal

References

XFL (2001) teams
Sports clubs established in 2001
Sports clubs disestablished in 2001
Enforcers
2001 establishments in Illinois
2001 disestablishments in Illinois
Chicago Enforcers
American football teams in Illinois